Crassispira hondurasensis is a species of sea snail, a marine gastropod mollusk in the family Pseudomelatomidae.

Description
The length of the shell attains 8 mm.

The whorls are nodosely ribbed, with revolving striae, and a smooth space below the sutures. it is alternately banded with yellow and ash-color.

Distribution
This marine species occurs off Honduras

References

 Reeve, L. 1846. Monograph of the genus Pleurotoma Conchologia Iconica 1 pls. 34-40

External links
 
 

hondurasensis
Gastropods described in 1846